Backhouse was launched in 1785 at Chester. She initially sailed as a West Indiaman. In 1792–1793 she made one voyage as a slave ship in the triangular trade in enslaved people. In 1796 and again in 1797 she repelled an attack by a French privateer in single-ship actions. Backhouse made four more slave trading voyages and then returned to the West Indies trade. After about 1809 she became a London coaster and was last listed in 1813.

Career
Backhouse first appeared in Lloyd's Register in 1787. On 20 December 1786 Backhouse, Collinson, master, sailed from Liverpool for Grenada.

1st slave trading voyage (1792–1793): Captain James Harrocks sailed from Liverpool on 27 October 1792 bound for West Africa. Backhouse started gathering her slaves at Bonny on 12 January 1793. She departed from Africa on 6 May with 296 slaves. She was at Grenada and then arrived at Montego Bay, Jamaica on 5 July with 281 slaves. Harrocks died on 19 July. The mention in Lloyd's List on Backhouses arrival at Jamaica referred to "late Harrocks". Captain Michael Pele replaced Harrocks. Backhouse sailed for home on 11 October and arrived at Liverpool on 21 December. She had left Liverpool with 33 crew members and lost 17 on her voyage.

In 1794 and 1795 two captains received letters of marque, John Marr on 28 March 1794 and James Thomson on 9 December 1795. There is a record in Lloyd's Lists ship arrival and departure data of Captain Marr sailing to Dominica, but no mention of Captain Thomson.

On 8 October 1796, as Captain James Flanagan was sailing Backhouse from Liverpool to Martinique, a French cutter brig privateer of 16 guns shadowed them from 8am to 9pm, before engaging them. After firing some shots the French vessel stood off, but continued to the chase through the night. Next morning the French vessel renewed the engagement. Backhouse was down to her last two cartridges when the privateer sheared off; Flanagan immediately set off in pursuit, till the privateer escaped. Flanagan resumed his voyage. The privateer came up the next day again, but when Flanagan demonstrated his intention to engage, sheared off, with Backhouse in pursuit for a time.

In July 1797 as Backhouse was sailing from Saint Vincent back to Liverpool, a French privateer schooner of sixteen 6-pounder guns came up. Captain Flanagan had a crew of only 15 men, including himself, but with the assistance of three gentleman passengers, was able to exchange fire for two-and-a-half hours before the French vessel withdrew. There were no British casualties.

In 1797 Backhouse returned to the slave trade.

2nd slave trading voyage (1797–1798): Captain James Hunter sailed from Liverpool on 26 September 1797. Backhouse gathered her slaves at Bonny and arrived at Kingston, Jamaica in April 1798 with 303 slaves. She brought with her a Spanish prize.

3rd slave trading voyage (1800–1801): Captain A. Harding sailed from London on 13 April 1800. Backhouse gathered her slaves on the Gold Coast and arrived at Demerara on 30 May 1801 with 200 slaves. On 5 September 1801 she had parted from the homeward-bound convoy from Tortola to London in a very heavy gale, and then had to put into Lisbon for repairs. The crew had had to cut away her mizzen mast and throw overboard five hogsheads of sugar to right Backhouse. She also lost her anchors and eight guns. Backhouse arrived back in London on 31 December 1801.

4th slave trading voyage (1802–1803): Captain M.Jenkins sailed from London on 5 March 1802. Backhouse started gathering slaves on the Gold Coast on 11 May. She arrived at St Vincent on 29 December with 198 slaves. At some point Captain Lawson replaced Jenkins as she had arrived at St Vincent as Backhoue, "late Jenkins". Backhhouse, Lawson, master, arrived back in London on 3 April 1803.

On 4 November 1803 Backhouse, Smith, master, left Gravesend for Africa. On 13 December she and a number of other Arica-bound vessels were reported "all well" at  after a heavy gale had dispersed the fleet. On 13 August 1804 she was back at Gravesend, from Africa. Absent original research it is not clear whether this was a simple trading voyage or an aborted slave-trading voyage.

5th slave trading voyage (1804–1805): Captain Thomas Ramsay sailed from London on 29 October 1804, and by 16 December was at Madeira. Backhouse arrived at St Lucia on 16 July 1805 with 153 slaves. She was sold there. She arrived back at London on 12 December 1805.

Fate
Backhouse was last listed in 1813 with data unchanged from 1809.

Notes, citations, and references
Notes

Citations

References
 
 

1785 ships
Age of Sail merchant ships of England
Liverpool slave ships
London slave ships